Albin is a masculine Polish, Scandinavian, German, French and Slovenian given name, from the Roman cognate Albinus, derived from the Latin albus, meaning "white" or "bright". This name may also be a last name. In Estonia, France, Hungary, Poland, Slovakia, and Sweden March 1 is Albin's Name day. There are variant spellings, including Albinas, a male given name in Lithuania; Aubin, a French masculine given name; and Albina, an Ancient Roman, Czech, Galician, Italian, Polish, Slovak, and Slovenian feminine given name. Albin is uncommon as a surname. People with the given name Albin include:

People
 Albin of Brechin (d. 1269), Scottish bishop
 Albín Brunovský (1935–1997), Slovak painter, graphic artist, lithographer, illustrator and pedagogue
 Albin Dunajewski (1817–1894), Polish political activist and Bishop of Kraków
 Albin Ebondo (b. 1984), French footballer
 Albin Egger-Lienz (1868–1926), Austrian painter
 Albin Ekdal (b. 1989), Swedish attacking midfielder
 Albin Eser (b. 1935), German jurist and an ad litem judge
 Albin Granlund (b. 1989), Finnish footballer
 Albin Grau (1884–1942), German artist, architect and occultist, and the producer and production designer for F.W. Murnau's "Nosferatu"
 Albin Gutman (b. 1947), Slovenian general
 Albin Haller (1849–1925), French chemist
 Albin Julius (1967–2022), Austrian martial music and industrial artist
 Albin Killat (b. 1961), German diver
 Albin Kitzinger (1912–1970), German footballer
 Albin Köbis (1892–1917), German sailor 
 Albin Kurti (b. 1975), Kosovo activist
 Albin Lermusiaux (1874–1940), French, Olympic shooter
 Albin Polasek (1879–1965), Czech-American sculptor and educator
 Albin Provosty (1865-1932), American politician
 Albin W. Norblad (1939–2014), American judge
 Albin Nyamoya (1924–2001), Prime Minister of Burundi 
 Albin Roussin (1781–1854), French admiral and statesman
 Albin F. Schoepf (1822–1886), Polish-born American military officer 
 Albin Schram (1926–2005) Czech, one of the greatest collectors of autograph letters by shapers of world history
 Albin Starc (b. 1916), Croatian World War II pilot
 Albin Stenroos (1889–1971), Finnish, Olympic winner of the marathon race 
 Albin Ström (1892–1962), Swedish socialist politician
 Albin Sandqvist, Swedish electronic and dance pop singer known by mononym Albin. Also part of Swedish pop band Star Pilots 
 Albin Vidović (1943–2018), Croatian, Olympic handballer
 Albin Zollinger (1895–1941), Swiss writer

See also
 The name Brfxxccxxmnpcccclllmmnprxvclmnckssqlbb11116, pronounced Albin, given by Swedish parents to their child as protest against Sweden's infant naming laws

References

Polish masculine given names
Scandinavian masculine given names
Slovene masculine given names